Spencer Williams may refer to:

Spencer Williams (1889–1965), American jazz musician
Spencer Williams Jr. (1893–1969), African American actor and filmmaker
Spencer Mortimer Williams (1922–2008), United States federal judge